Sir William Mitchell Ramsay, FBA (15 March 185120 April 1939) was a Scottish archaeologist and New Testament scholar.  By his death in 1939 he had become the foremost authority of his day on the history of Asia Minor and a leading scholar in the study of the New Testament.

Ramsay was educated in the Tübingen school of thought (founded by F. C. Baur) which doubted the reliability of the New Testament, but his extensive archaeological and historical studies convinced him of its historical accuracy. From the post of Professor of Classical Art and Architecture at Oxford, he was appointed Regius Professor of Humanity (the Latin Professorship) at Aberdeen.

Knighted in 1906 to mark his distinguished service to the world of scholarship, Ramsay also gained three honorary fellowships from Oxford colleges, nine honorary doctorates from British, Continental and North American universities, and became an honorary member of almost every association devoted to archaeology and historical research. He was one of the original members of the British Academy, and was awarded the Gold Medal of Pope Leo XIII in 1893 and the Victorian Medal of the Royal Geographical Society in 1906.

Life
Ramsay was born in Glasgow, Scotland, the youngest son of a third-generation lawyer, Thomas Ramsay and his wife Jane Mitchell, daughter of William Mitchell. His father died when he was six years old, and the family moved from the city to the family home in the country district near Alloa. The help of his older brother and his maternal uncle, Andrew Mitchell of Alloa, made it possible for him to have an education at the Gymnasium in Old Aberdeen.

Ramsay studied at the University of Aberdeen, where he achieved high distinction and later became Professor of Humanity.  He won a scholarship to St. John's College, Oxford, where he obtained a first class in classical moderations (1874) and in literae humaniores (1876). He also studied Sanskrit under scholar Theodor Benfey at Göttingen.

In 1880 Ramsay received an Oxford studentship for travel and research in Greece. At Smyrna, he met Sir C. W. Wilson, then British consul-general in Anatolia, who advised him on inland areas suitable for exploration. Ramsay and Wilson made two long journeys during 1881 and 1882.

He traveled widely in Asia Minor and rapidly became the recognized authority on all matters relating to the districts associated with St Paul's missionary journeys and on Christianity in the early Roman Empire. Greece and Turkey remained the focus of Ramsay's research for the remainder of his academic career. In 1883, he discovered the world's oldest complete piece of music, the Seikilos epitaph. In the late 19th century, he discovered two of the most important Phrygian monuments – the rock tombs "Aslantaş" (Lion Stone) and "Yılantaş" (Snake Stone), located close to the city center of Afyon. In 1890 he discovered inscriptions in an unknown Anatolian language, Pisidian, a description of which he published in 1895. He was known for his expertise in the historic geography and topography of Asia Minor and of its political, social, cultural, and religious history.

After becoming a Fellow of Exeter College, Oxford in 1882, from 1885 to 1886 Ramsay held the newly created Lincoln Professor of Classical Archaeology and Art at Oxford and became a fellow of Lincoln College (honorary fellow 1898). In 1886 Ramsay was appointed Regius Professor of Humanity at the University of Aberdeen. He remained affiliated with Aberdeen until his retirement in 1911.

From 1880 onwards he received the honorary degrees of D.C.L. Oxford, LL.D. St Andrews and Glasgow, and D.D. Edinburgh. In 1906, Ramsay was knighted for his scholarly achievements on the 400th anniversary of the founding of the University of Aberdeen. He was elected a member of learned societies in Europe and America and was awarded medals by the Royal Geographical Society and the University of Pennsylvania.

In 1919, Ramsay served as president of the Geographical Association.

Family
His wife, Agnes, Lady Ramsay, granddaughter of Dr Andrew Marshall of Kirkintilloch, accompanied him in many of his journeys and is the author of Everyday Life in Turkey (1897) and The Romance of Elisavet (1899).  He was a grandson of entrepreneur William Mitchell (1781–1854). Other relatives include Mary Ramsay and Agnes Margaret Ramsay who were responsible for contributing several photographs and illustrations in his work on The Letters to the Seven Churches.

Contribution to biblical studies
Ramsay first went to Asia Minor, where many of the cities mentioned in the Book of Acts had no definite location. Later in life he concluded: '"Further study … showed that the book could bear the most minute scrutiny as an authority for the facts of the Aegean world, and that it was written with such judgment, skill, art and perception of truth as to be a model of historical statement" (The Bearing of Recent Discovery, p. 85).  On page 89 of the same book, Ramsay accounted, "You may press the words of Luke in a degree beyond any other historian's". On the authorship of the Pauline epistles he concluded that all thirteen New Testament letters ostensibly written by Paul were authentic.

Publications 
 Pictures of the Apostolic Church: Studies in the Book of Acts
 The Bearing of Recent Discovery (1915), 4th edition (1920)
 The Church of the Roman Empire Before AD 170
The Cities and Bishoprics of Phrygia (2 vols., 1895, 1897)
 The First Christian Century: Notes on Dr. Moffatt's Introduction to the Literature of the New Testament
 The Historical Geography of Asia Minor (1890)
The Church in the Roman Empire (1893)
St Paul the Traveller and the Roman Citizen (1895; German translation, 1898)
Impressions of Turkey (1897)
Was Christ born at Bethlehem? (1898)
Historical Commentary on Galatians (1899)
The Education of Christ (1902)
The Letters to the Seven Churches of Asia (1904)
Pauline and other Studies in Early Christian History (1906)
Studies in the History and Art of the Eastern Provinces of the Roman Empire (1906)
The Cities of St Paul (1907)
Lucan and Pauline Studies (1908)
The Thousand and One Churches (with Gertrude L. Bell, 1909)
The Imperial Peace (1913)
The Teaching of Paul in Terms of the Present Day (1913)
Recent Research and the New Testament (1914)
The Making of a University (1915)
 [https://archive.org/details/intermixtureofra00ramsuoft/page/n1/mode/2up The Intermixture of Races in Asia Minor : Some of its Causes and Effects] (Oxford: University Press, 1917)
Life and Letters of William Black (1918)
Articles in learned periodicals and the 9th, 10th and 11th editions of the Encyclopædia Britannica.
Articles in Hastings' Dictionary of the Bible. Achaia, Adramyttium, Antioch in Pisidia, Asia, Asiarch, Bithynia, Cappadocia, Caria, Chios, Churches ( Robbers of), Cilicia, Cnidus, Colossae, Corinth, Cos, Delos, Derbe, Diana, Ephesian, Ephesus, Galatia, Galatia (Region of), Galatians, Halicarnassus, Hierapolis, Iconium, Laodicea, Lasea, Lycaona, Lycia, Lydia, Lystra, Mallus, Miletus, Myndus, Myra, Mysia, Nicopolis, Pamphylia, Patara, Perga, Pergamus, or Pergamum, Phasaelis, Philadelphia, Phoenix, Phrygia, Pisidia, Pontus, Rhegium, Rhodes, Samothrace, Sardis, Smyrna, Syracuse, Tarsus, Thracia, Town Clerk, Troas, Tyrannus.
 Supplement Hastings' Dictionary of the Bible Numbers, Hours, Years and Dates, Religion of Greece and Asia Minor, Roads and Travel ( in NT),

See also
Christian apologetics
Parlais

References

Sources
 Letters to the Seven Churches, Preface. (William Mitchell Ramsay)

External links

 
 The Cities and Bishoprics of Phrygia, chapter 3

1851 births
1939 deaths
People from Clackmannanshire
Converts to Protestantism from atheism or agnosticism
British biblical scholars
New Testament scholars
Historians of Christianity
Archaeologists from Glasgow
Alumni of St John's College, Oxford
Alumni of the University of Aberdeen
Academics of the University of Aberdeen
Fellows of Exeter College, Oxford
Fellows of Lincoln College, Oxford
Knights Bachelor
Victorian writers
19th-century archaeologists
20th-century archaeologists
19th-century Scottish historians
20th-century Scottish historians
Lincoln Professors of Classical Archaeology and Art
Fellows of the British Academy
British historians of religion
Victoria Medal recipients
Scottish Christians
Travelers in Asia Minor